Tom Hall is an American game designer best known for his work with id Software on titles such as Doom and Commander Keen.

Career
Hall attended the University of Wisconsin–Madison, where he earned a B.S. in Computer Science. In 1987, Hall worked at Softdisk Inc., where he was both a programmer and the editor of Softdisk, a software bundle delivered monthly. Along with some of his co-workers, John Carmack, John Romero and Adrian Carmack, he founded id Software. He served as creative director and designer there, working on games such as the Commander Keen series, Wolfenstein 3D, Spear of Destiny, and Doom.

After some disputes with John Carmack about the design for Doom, Tom left id Software in August 1993 to join Apogee/3D Realms. He was the game designer for Rise of the Triad, produced Terminal Velocity, and helped in varying degrees on Duke Nukem II and Duke Nukem 3D as well. He also worked on the Prey engine until August 12, 1996, when he left Apogee.

Hall co-founded Ion Storm with John Romero, where he produced Anachronox. The company also produced the 2000 Game of the Year, Deus Ex, in which Hall voiced several characters. He and Romero then founded Monkeystone Games, a company with the goal of producing mobile games in the new mobile industry. He designed, and Romero programmed, Hyperspace Delivery Boy!, which was released on December 23, 2001.

He and Romero joined Midway Games in 2003, and Monkeystone closed in January 2005. Hall also left Midway early that year and did independent game consultation work out of Austin, Texas until in February he joined a startup company called KingsIsle Entertainment based in the same area.

Hall left KingsIsle Entertainment and joined Loot Drop on January 1, 2011. Along with Loot Drop, he unsuccessfully tried to crowdfund a game called Shaker on the crowdfunding platform Kickstarter during October 2012. Hall later tried to crowdfund another game on Kickstarter, Worlds of Wander, which was also unsuccessful in reaching its goal.

In March 2013, Hall joined PlayFirst as Principal Designer.

Dopefish
Hall is the creator of the Dopefish, a green, dimwitted fish in Commander Keen episode IV. References to it have appeared in other video games, including the Quake series, Rise of the Triad, Daikatana, and Max Payne since.

Voice work
Hall provided the following voices for the computer role-playing game Deus Ex: Morpheus, a sentient AI; Howard Strong, a ruthless and cruel MJ12 operative; and Walton Simons, the nano-augmented Director of the Federal Emergency Management Agency (FEMA). He also voiced the project director in Deus Ex: Invisible War opening cutscene, and PAL-18, Councilman Willis, Dr. Hush-Hush and Eddie the Chew in Anachronox. He was also the voice and likeness of the main antagonist of Rise of the Triad, El Oscuro, voiced the Death Monk enemies from the game, and earlier he voiced some of the characters in Wolfenstein 3D, including the female character Gretel Grösse.

Personal life
Hall suffered a stroke on Tuesday, April 13, 2010. He was in rehabilitation until April 21, when he was released. He was married for eighteen years to Terri Hall, who died on May 2, 2021.

Games

References

External links

 
 
 

American video game designers
Creative directors
Id Software people
Living people
People from Wisconsin
University of Wisconsin–Madison College of Letters and Science alumni
Year of birth missing (living people)